Rear Admiral Roger Charles Moylan-Jones (born 18 April 1940) is a former English cricketer and Royal Navy officer. Moylan-Jones was a right-handed batsman who bowled right-arm off break. He was born in Torquay, Devon and educated at King Edward VI Grammar School in Totnes.

Moylan-Jones first represented the Royal Navy in cricket in 1959. This was also the year in which he made his Minor Counties Championship debut for Devon against Dorset. An infrequent performer for Devon due to his naval commitments meant he was limited to just 28 appearances for the county between 1959 and 1975, playing his final match for them against the Somerset Second XI. He played just one first-class match, which came for the Combined Services against Oxford University. In the Oxford University first-innings he took his only 2 first-class wickets, those of Maurice Manasseh and Richard Gilliat, for the cost of 36 runs. With the bat he scored 3 runs in the Combined Services first-innings before being dismissed by John Martin and in their second-innings he scored 31 runs, being dismissed this time by Andrew Barker.

In the Royal Navy, Moylan-Jones rose to the rank of rear admiral and later served as the president of the Royal Navy Cricket Club 1993–1995 and Director General Aircraft (Navy) from 1992 to 1995. Moylan-Jones became chairman of Devon County Cricket Club in 1997, a post he held until 2009 when he stepped down, being replaced by Geoff Evans. Following this he became club president, taking over from the late David Shepherd.

References

External links
Roger Moylan-Jones at ESPNcricinfo
Roger Moylan-Jones at CricketArchive

1940 births
Living people
Sportspeople from Torquay
People educated at Totnes Grammar School
English cricketers
Devon cricketers
Combined Services cricketers
English cricket administrators
Royal Navy officers
Royal Navy rear admirals